Jim George is a Scottish former football player and manager.

Honours
Dumbarton
Stirlingshire Cup : 1989-90, 1990–91

References

Year of birth missing
Possibly living people
Scottish footballers
Association football midfielders
St Johnstone F.C. players
East Fife F.C. players
Queen of the South F.C. players
Glasgow United F.C. players
Scottish Football League players
Scottish football managers
Dumbarton F.C. managers
Scottish Football League managers